The College of Saint Rose is a private Roman Catholic college in Albany, New York. It was founded in 1920 by the Sisters of St. Joseph of Carondelet as a women's college. It became fully co-educational in 1969; the following year, the college added laypersons to its board and became an independent college sponsored by the sisters.

The college is in the Pine Hills neighborhood of Albany. It is a Division II member of the National Collegiate Athletic Association (NCAA).

History

The idea for The College of Saint Rose was conceived by Monsignor Joseph A. Delaney, the vicar general of the Roman Catholic Diocese of Albany in 1920. He aimed to create a Catholic college for women in the area between the two nearest Catholic colleges in New York City and Buffalo. With this in mind, Delaney contacted Sister Blanche Rooney, a member of the local chapter of the Sisters of Saint Joseph of Carondelet, located in the Provincial House on Eighth Street in Troy, New York. Rooney and her sisters were receptive to the idea and, with the permission and support of Bishop of Albany Edmund F. Gibbons and Rooney, Delaney purchased the William Keeler estate at 979 Madison Avenue. Upon granting of a provisional charter from the Board of Regents, The College of Saint Rose was established as a college for women with a liberal arts curriculum in Albany, New York on June 28, 1920.

The college's founders selected its name to honor the first canonized saint in the Americas, Saint Rose of Lima. Initially, emphasis was placed on the professional training of teachers, but it quickly expanded to include preparation for business and other professions.

The college created an evening division in 1946 to serve World War II veterans. In 1949, the college opened a graduate school. Men were allowed to enter the evening and graduate divisions. The college became fully coeducational in 1969. Campus housing was made available to male students in the 1970s. The evening division was re-instituted in 1974.

In 1970, 10 laypersons were added to the board of trustees, and the College became an independent college sponsored by the Sisters of Saint Joseph of Carondelet.

In December 2015, the college announced plans to eliminate 27 academic programs and 23 faculty positions. The eliminated programs enrolled just four percent of the student body, and 12 of the academic programs contained no enrollees. The college asserted that the cuts were necessary to ensure the college's future viability. Two months later, the faculty of the college passed a "no confidence" motion in regard to college President Carolyn J. Stefanco, who remained in her post until 2020. An investigatory committee of the American Association of University Professors concluded that the college's layoffs "violated shared governance and undermined tenure and academic freedom" and "violated the association's principles and standards".

In 2020, the College made $8 million in administrative budget cuts. In December of that year, the College announced that it would eliminate 16 bachelor's degree programs, six master’s degree programs, and three certificate programs as a cost-saving measure in an effort to achieve a balanced budget by 2023. In December 2021, four St. Rose professors who were terminated in connection with the December 2020 downsizing won a lawsuit against the College and were reinstated; a court found that the College had not acted in accordance with its own faculty handbook. However, in October 2022, this decision was overturned by the Appellate Division of state Supreme Court's Third Department.

Campus
The campus of The College of Saint Rose is located in the Pine Hills neighborhood of Albany, the capital city of New York. The 46-acre campus is bounded by Western Avenue to the north, Partridge Street to the east, Morris Street to the south, and Main Avenue to the west, although there is college property north of Western and east of Partridge. Because of the college's urban location, all new expansion of the main Pine Hills campus' footprint occurs either through acquisition of existing structures or demolition and construction of new structures. Over the years the college has gradually acquired many of the Victorian-era homes adjacent to the main campus. Many of these structures, most of which are located on Partridge Street and Western and Madison avenues, have been converted into offices and student housing. The slow expansion of the College into the surrounding neighborhood has occasionally led to conflict with local neighborhood and historic conservation associations. 

St. Joseph Hall is a four-story English brick building with limestone trim fronted by six Corinthian columns. It is located at 985 Madison Avenue between the Science Center to the west and Moran Hall to the east. The structure was built in 1922 at a cost of half a million dollars due to a need for classroom and dining space to house the growing student body. As the first academic building constructed specifically for the college, St. Joseph Hall originally included an auditorium, classrooms, chapel, dormitory, a dining area and kitchens in the basement.

The Massry Center for the Arts features the Kathleen McManus Picotte Recital Hall, the Esther Massry Gallery, and the William Randolph Hearst Music Wing. This building serves as the primary venue for concerts and exhibitions by the college's students and faculty, and as a performance and exhibition space for artists, musicians, vocalists and orchestras. The Massry Center has received a LEED gold award for being one of the most energy-efficient buildings in the Capital Region.

Satellite facilities
The college's Christian Plumeri Sports Complex was constructed at a cost of $4.7 million. The college's funding for the complex included a $1 million challenge contribution from Joe Plumeri, Chairman and CEO of Willis Group Holdings and the college's 2006 commencement speaker. The complex was named in honor of Plumeri's deceased son.

Athletics

The College of Saint Rose is a Division II member of the National Collegiate Athletic Association (NCAA), offering 19 varsity intercollegiate sports at the NCAA Division II level. Shortly before 2000, Saint Rose became a member of the Northeast-10 Conference (NE-10). The school's primary colors are white and gold, but black and gold are used for marketing purposes. The school's NCAA Division II sports teams are referred to as the Golden Knights. This led to controversy when the Vegas Golden Knights joined the National Hockey League in 2017, when the College of Saint Rose raised objections that led to Vegas's trademark application being initially denied, though it was later approved on appeal.

In 2009, the Saint Rose women's soccer became the third team in Northeast-10 Conference history (1985) to win three consecutive postseason league titles. The team's season record was 24–1, and it was ranked fourth in the United States at season's end.

Notable faculty and alumni

Notable alumni
 Philip Amelio, actor and teacher
 Nicholas Anthony Ascioti, composer and conductor
 Glen Barker, former Major League Baseball player later employed by the Houston Astros as Director of Pacific Rim Scouting
 Peter Daempfle, science author and educator
 Mary Daly, radical feminist philosopher and theologian. Taught at Boston College. Wrote on religion and women
 Jimmy Fallon, actor and television personality. He left school before graduating to join a comedy troupe, and completed his Bachelor of Arts degree in communications in 2009. He later received the honorary degree of Doctor of Humane Letters.
 Patricia A. Fennell, sociologist
 Marilee Jones, former dean of admissions at the Massachusetts Institute of Technology and co-author of Less Stress, More Success. Resigned from MIT after it was discovered that she had falsely claimed academic degrees and credentials she had not earned.
 Garth Joseph, professional basketball player
 Joan Lescinski, 13th president of St. Ambrose University in Davenport, Iowa
 Elizabeth O'Connor Little, New York State Senator
 Jon Mueller (master's), college baseball coach at University at Albany, SUNY
 Brian Patneaude, jazz saxophonist and band leader
 Loretta A. Preska, Chief Judge of the United States District Court for the Southern District of New York and a former nominee to the U.S. Court of Appeals for the Second Circuit
 Robert Reilly, Democratic member of the New York State Assembly for the 109th district
 Melissa Sgambelluri, actress, dancer, and singer, most famous for her appearances on American Idol Seasons 5 and 6.
 James Nicholas Tedisco, Republican member of the New York State Assembly and New York State Senate. He was the Assembly's Minority Leader from November 2005 to April 2009.
 Marcia White, President and Executive Director of the Saratoga Performing Arts Center

Notable faculty
Sharon Louden, visual artist
Evan Mack, librettist and composer
Daniel Nester, writer, editor and poet
Doris Grumbach, educator, author

References

External links

 

 
Educational institutions established in 1920
Former Catholic universities and colleges in the United States
Education in Albany, New York
U.S. Route 20
Universities and colleges in Albany County, New York
College of Saint Rose
1920 establishments in New York (state)
Organizations based in Albany, New York